Back to Basics is the eighth studio album and tenth overall album by  Bay Area-based R&B group Maze, released in 1993 on Warner Bros. Records.

Track listing
All songs written by  Frankie Beverly

"Nobody Knows What You Feel Inside"	5:36 	
"Love Is"	5:38 	
"The Morning After" 	5:38 	
"Laid Back Girl" 	5:30	
"What Goes Up"   	6:11 	
"In Time"	6:05 	
"All Night Long" 	5:25
"Don't Wanna Lose Your Love" 	5:44
"Twilight" (Instrumental) 	7:27

Charts

Singles

External links
 Maze Featuring Frankie Beverly -Back to Basics at Discogs

References

1993 albums
Maze (band) albums
Warner Records albums